Hunter House Publishers was a publishing company based in Alameda, California which was established in 1978.

It is a small publishing press "specializing in self-help books about health, relationships, abuse and sexuality."

Two of its award-winning books are Look Great, Live Green: Choosing Beauty Solutions That Are Planet-Safe and Budget-Smart, a Benjamin Franklin Book Award winner, and The Highly Intuitive Child: A Guide to Understanding and Parenting Unusually Sensitive and Empathic Children, a finalist, in the 2010 Benjamin Franklin Book, from the Independent Book Publishers Association.

Turner Publishing Company acquired Hunter House in 2014.

References

Companies based in Alameda, California
Book publishing companies based in the San Francisco Bay Area
Publishing companies established in 1978